This is a list of shopping malls in Turkey. Opening year is given in parentheses.

Adana

 Optimum Outlet (2011)

Projected
 Forum Adana

Afyon
 Afium
 Zeyland Avm

Aksaray
 Aksaray Efor AVM
 Aybimaş Gross (2020)

Ankara

 365 (2008), Çankaya
 Acity (2008), Yenimahalle
 Ankamall (1999), Akköprü
 Antares (2008), Etlik
 Arcadium (2003), Çayyolu
 Armada (2002), Söğütözü
 Atlantis (2011), Batıkent
 Aybimaş Tanzim (2019), Yenimahalle
 Cepa (2007), Mustafa Kemal
 Forum Ankara (2008)
 Gimart (2014), Yenimahalle
 Gordion (2009), Çayyolu
 Karum (1991), Kavaklıdere
 KentPark (2009), Mustafa Kemal
 Minasera (2008), Çayyolu
 Nata Vega (2011), Mamak
 Next Level (2013), Söğütözü
 Optimum Outlet (2004), Etimesgut
 Panora (2008), Or-An
 Park Vera (2014), Etimesgut
 Podium (2015), Yenimahalle
 Taurus (2013), Balgat

Antalya

 Antalya Migros Shopping Center (2001)
 Deepo Outlet Center (2004), Altınova
 Kipa AVM, Fabrikalar
 Laura Shopping Center (2004), Lara
 Mark Antalya, Muratpaşa
 Özdilek Park (2009), Dokuma
 Real Shopping Mall (2006), Muratpaşa
 Shemall (2008), Lara
 Terra City (2011), Lara

Artvin
 İstanbul Bazzar (2010), Hopa
 Artrium AVM (?)

Aydın
 OPS mall (2023)

Balıkesir
 Yaylada (2007)

Bolu
 Bekcioğlu Avm (2009)

Bursa
 Anatolium AVM (2010)
 As Merkez Outlet (2003)
 CarrefourSA (2002)
 Kent Meydani (2008)
 Korupark (2007)
 Özdilek (1983)
 Zafer Plaza (1999)
 Sur Yapi Marka AVM (2017)

Denizli
 Forum Çamlık (2008)
 Teras Park (2007)

Diyarbakır
 Ceylan Karavil Park (2014)
 Forum Diyarbakır (2015)

Edirne
 Margi Outlet (2011)
 Edirne Erasta AVM

Elazığ
 Misland

Erzurum
 Erzurum Avm (2009)

Eskişehir
 Espark (2007)
 Kanatlı (2007)
 Neo Eskişehir (2007)
 Özdilek (2011)

Gaziantep
 Forum Gaziantep (2013)
 M1 Tepe Gaziantep (1999)
 Prime Mall Gaziantep (2013)
 Sanko Park (2009)

Hatay
 Palladium Antakya (2013)
 Prime Mall Antakya (2011)
 Prime Mall İskenderun (2010)

Isparta
IYAŞ Park Avm (2008)

Istanbul
 List of shopping malls in Istanbul

İzmir

 Agora (2003), Balçova
 Asmaçatı Shopping and Meeting Point (2011), Balçova
 CarrefourSA Shopping Center (2000), Karşıyaka (damaged)
 Ege Park Balçova (2010), Balçova
 Ege Park Mavişehir (1999), (previously EGS Park Mavişehir), Karşıyaka
 Forum Bornova Shopping Center (2006), Bornova
 İzmir Park (2014), Konak
 Kids Mall (2012), Bornova
 Konak Pier, Konak Pier (2002), Konak
 Optimum İzmir (2012), Gaziemir
 Özdilek (2001), Balçova
 Palmiye Shopping Center (2003), Balçova
 Park Bornova Outlet Center (2004), (previously EGS Park Bornova (1997) and EGS Outlet (2000)), Bornova
 Selway Outlet Park, Balçova
 Tesco-Kipa Shopping Center, Balçova
 Tesco-Kipa Shopping Center (1999), Çiğli
 Mavibahçe, (2015) Karşıyaka
 Ege Perla Mall (2017), Konak
 Point Bornova Mall(2016), Bornova

Projected
Hilltown Karşıyaka, Karşıyaka(2019)

Kahramanmaraş
Arnelia AVM 2008
Arsan Outlet Center 2008
Rönesans Piazza AVM (2013)

Karabük
Atamerkez Avm (2002), Safranbolu
Kares Avm (2011)
Onel Avm (2006)

Kastamonu
Barutçuoğlu Avm (2006)

Kayseri
 Byz Garage Avm (2013)
 Forum Kayseri (2012)
 İpeksaray Avm (2006)
 Kasseria Avm (1996)
 Kayseri Park (2006)
 Meysu Outlet Avm (2011)

Kırıkkale

 Aybimaş (1982)
 Altunbilekler AVM (2012)
 Makro Market (2006)
 Podium AVM (2014)

Kocaeli
 Gebze Center (2010)

Kuşadası, Aydın
 Kuşadası AVM (2013)

Malatya
 Malatya Park (2009)

Manisa
 Magnesia (2012)

Mersin

Mersin Forum (2007)
Kipa Outlet (2008)
Mersin Marina (2011)
Palmcity (2014)

Tarsus, Mersin
Tarsu (2012)

Muğla

Bodrum
 Midtown (2012)
 Milta (1999)
 Oasis (1998)
 Palmarina (2014)

Fethiye 
Erasta (2014)
Tesco-Kipa Shopping Center  (2010)

Nevşehir
 Forum Kapadokya (2010)

Sakarya
 Ada Avm (2007), Adapazarı
 Agora Avm (2015), Adapazarı
 Kipa Avm (2010), Adapazarı
  Serdivan Avm (2010), Adapazarı

Samsun
 Bulvar Samsun (2012)
 Lovelet (2012)
 Piazza Samsun

Şanlıurfa
 Piazza Şanlıurfa (2013)

Tekirdağ
 Tekira (2008)

Çorlu
 Avantaj Outlet Center (1997)
 Orion (1999)
 Trend Arena (2016)

Trabzon
 Cevahir Outlet Avm (2009)
 Forum Trabzon (2008)
 Varlıbaş AVM (2010)

Zonguldak
 DemirPark
 Ereylin

See also
 List of shopping malls

Shopping malls
Turkey